José Ignacio Zapatero Ferreras (born Zamora, 25 November 1971) is a Spanish former rugby union player. He plays as a prop.

Career
His first international match was against Italy at Perpignan on 21 June 1993. He was part of the 1999 Rugby World Cup roster. His last international cap was during a match against Romania, at Madrid on 9 March 2003.

References

External links
 José Ignacio Zapatero International Statistics
 Entrevista a José I. Zapatero

1974 births
Living people
Spanish rugby union players
Rugby union props
Spain international rugby union players
People from Zamora, Spain
Sportspeople from the Province of Zamora